Nan'ao One is a ,  wide Chinese merchant ship that sank in the Sandianjin waters off the coast of Nan'ao Island, about 5.6 nautical miles from Swatow (Shantou), Guangdong, Ming China. Accidentally discovered by a group of local fishermen in May 2007, it is currently considered the first late Ming dynasty (1368–1644) ship ever found and probably the only one from the reign of the Wanli Emperor (1573–1620) that China has discovered to date. It was likely on the route from the port of Yuegang in Fujian to Manila, Spanish Philippines.

See also
Nanhai One
Huaguangjiao One
Swatow ware
Kraak ware

References

External links
Over 800 relics found on 'Nan'ao-1' - Video at China.org.cn
The Past Came Alive in 2010 Photos 27/32 of the Nan'ao One - at Beijing Review

Shipwrecks in the South China Sea
Merchant ships of China
Shantou
2007 archaeological discoveries
Ming dynasty
Underwater archaeological sites
Shipwrecks of China